Doonan is a rural residential locality split between the Sunshine Coast Region and the Shire of Noosa, both in Queensland, Australia.

Geography 
The northern part is within the local government area of Shire of Noosa and the southern part is within Sunshine Coast Region; between 2008 and 2013 it was entirely within Sunshine Coast Region.

It was named after brothers Harold (1890-1966) and Allan Mitchell, who farmed the area from the Noosa Valley Golf Club through to Sunrise Road. The brothers served in the 5th Light Horse in the Middle East during World War I.

History 
The name is believed to come from the Aboriginal word for leaf.

From the 19th to 20th centuries, Doonan was settled by groups of agropastoralists with 359 acres of land and pastoral activities continued until the 1990s. There was a proposal for a link of its railway line from Eumundi to Tewantin, however the project was abandoned due to the outbreak of World War I.

Doonan Provisional School opened on 2 April 1919, with official opening performed on 9 April 1919 by Harry Walker and Richard Warren, both Members of the Queensland Legislative Assembly. In 1920 it became Doonan State School. It closed in 1954. It was at 813 Eumundi Noosa Road.

Doonan Lower State School opened in 1924 and closed circa 1931.

Noosa Pengari Steiner School opened in 1996.

Education 
Noosa Pengari Steiner School is a private primary and secondary (Prep-12) school for boys and girls at 86 Nyell Road. In 2018, the school had an enrolment of 298 students with 21 teachers (19 full-time equivalent) and 20 non-teaching staff (14 full-time equivalent).

There are no government schools in Doonan. The nearest government primary schools are Eumundi State School in neighbouring Eumundi to the west and the Noosaville State School in neighbouring Noosaville to the north-east. The nearest government secondary schools are Coolum State High School in Coolum Beach to the south-east, Sunshine Beach State High School in Sunshine Beach to the north-east, and Noosa District State High School in Cooroy/Pomona to the north-west.

Tourism 
Nestled in tranquil bush, Doonan is a mix of rural and residential areas. Its roads offer beautiful panoramic views of the Pacific Ocean. Doonan also has plenty of amenities, including a golf course, country club, day spa, farm gate and a variety of shops and cafes.

Facilities 
RSPCA Noosa is an animal shelter on the corner Hollett Raoad and West Eumundi Road.

References

External links
 University of Queensland: Queensland Places: Doonan

Suburbs of Noosa Shire, Queensland
Suburbs of the Sunshine Coast Region
Localities in Queensland